Lisbon is an unincorporated community in Harmony Township, Clark County, Ohio, USA.

History
Lisbon was laid out in 1815.

References

Unincorporated communities in Clark County, Ohio
1815 establishments in Ohio
Populated places established in 1815
Unincorporated communities in Ohio